Liudas Mažylis is a Lithuanian politician currently serving as a Member of the European Parliament for the Homeland Union.

References

Living people
MEPs for Lithuania 2019–2024
Homeland Union MEPs
Homeland Union politicians
Year of birth missing (living people)